Omar Mel (also Romanized as ‘Omar Mel) is a village in Baladarband Rural District, in the Central District of Kermanshah County, Kermanshah Province, Iran. At the 2006 census, its population was 296, in 63 families.

References 

Populated places in Kermanshah County